Sähkönsinistä Sinfoniaa (Finnish for Symphony in electric blue) is the first album from the Finnish hard rock band Kilpi.

Track listing
 "Tervetuloa (intro)" – 0:48
 "Samaan aikaan toisaalla" – 4:44
 "Antakaa aikaa" – 3:44
 "Nerokasta ikävää" – 3:59
 "Pahalle et käännä selkää" – 4:27
 "Savuna ilmaan" – 4:15
 "Kaksihaarainen kieli" – 4:25
 "Villin Vaaran Kosto" – 4:27
 "Piikkinä lihassa" – 4:58
 "Tähtien lapset" – 4:55
 "Helvetissä tavataan" – 3:44

2003 albums
Kilpi albums